Joseph M. Kyrillos Jr. (born April 12, 1960) is an American Republican Party politician and businessman from New Jersey. Kyrillos served in the New Jersey State Senate from 1992 to 2018, where he represented the 13th Legislative District, and in the General Assembly from 1988 to 1992.

Kyrillos started the consulting firm SK partners and is employed with Newport Capital Group, Red Bank, a financial services firm.  He is affiliated with Woodmont Properties, a regional real estate development company and is senior managing director of Newmark Grubb Knight Frank, a commercial real estate services firm.

From 2001 to 2004, Kyrillos served as Chairman of the New Jersey Republican State Committee and a member of the Republican National Committee. In that role, he facilitated the logistics and implementation of the 2004 Republican National Convention in New York City and read the delegate count for President George W. Bush’s nomination for re-election on the convention floor. He was the New Jersey Chairman of Mitt Romney’s campaign in 2008, and in 2009, he served as the Chairman of Governor Christie's successful campaign and as a member of the transition team. He served as a close advisor to former Florida Governor Jeb Bush in the 2016 Republican Party presidential primaries.

Early life and education 
Joseph M. Kyrillos Jr. was born April 12, 1960, in Kearny, New Jersey, one of four children of a pediatrician, Dr. Joseph M. Kyrillos, and his wife, Marguerite Kyrillos ( Shlala), who wed on May 11, 1958. His father and his mother's parents immigrated to the United States from Lebanon. His maternal grandfather worked as a tool and die maker at Thomas Edison's factory in West Orange. His mother graduated from college at age 50.

Kyrillos graduated from Rumson Country Day School and the Lawrenceville School. He received a B.A. degree from Hobart College in Political Science and was awarded an M.S. from Boston University in Communications.

After graduating from college, Kyrillos worked for Vice President George Bush during the 1984 Reagan-Bush campaign. Following the campaign, he served as Special Assistant to Secretary of the Interior Donald Hodel from 1985 to 1987.

Kyrillos has served on the Executive Committee of the National Conference of State Legislatures and as a trustee of the American Council of Young Political Leaders.

New Jersey Assembly (1988–1992)

Elections
Kyrillos was first elected to the New Jersey General Assembly in 1987, together with his incumbent running mate Joann H. Smith, with both candidates receiving more than $25,000 each in campaign funding from the $1.1 million spent by the New Jersey Republican State Committee to support candidates statewide. In 1989, he won re-election to a second term. After spending two terms in the Assembly, he retired to run for the seat in the New Jersey Senate in 1991.

Tenure
Kyrillos strongly opposed Democratic Governor Jim Florio's tax increases, citing his opposition to "the Florio tax plan" repeatedly in his campaign advertising. He also opposed the Abbott districts.

Committee assignments
Assembly Education Committee

New Jersey Senate (1992–2018)

Elections
In 1991, Kyrillos decided to run for the 13th District seat in the New Jersey Senate. He defeated incumbent appointed Senator James T. Phillips 68%-32%. In 1993, after redistricting, he won re-election to a second term with 64% of the vote. In 1997, he won re-election to a third term with 63% of the vote.

After redistricting, the 13th district became more competitive. In 2001, he won re-election to a fourth term (two-year term) with 64% of the vote. He won re-election to a fifth term in 2003 against former State Assemblyman Bill Flynn 54%-41%. In 2007, he won re-election to a sixth term with 61% of the vote. In 2011, he won re-election to a seventh term, defeating Hazlet Mayor Chris Cullen, 60%-37%.

Tenure
When Republicans held the legislative majority in the Statehouse, Kyrillos served as Majority Conference Leader and chaired standing committees on economic development and coastal resources.

Kyrillos was ranking member of the Economic Growth, Judiciary and Legislative Oversight committees.

On October 25, 2016, Kyrillos told Observer.com that he would not seek a re-election for the 2017 State Senate elections. He was succeeded by Assemblyman Declan O'Scanlon in 2018.

Committee assignments
Senate Natural Resources and Tourism Committee (Chairman)
Senate Economic Growth Committee 
Senate Judiciary Committee
Senate Oversight Committee

Other positions
Senate Majority Conference Leader
New Jersey Republican State Committee (Chairman)

District 13
Each of the forty districts in the New Jersey Legislature has one representative in the New Jersey Senate and two members in the New Jersey General Assembly. The Assembly representatives from the 13th District for the 2014–2015 Legislative Session were:
Assemblywoman Amy Handlin, and 
Assemblyman Declan O'Scanlon

Other political activities

1992 congressional election
In 1992, Kyrillos ran for the United States House of Representatives but was defeated by incumbent Democrat Frank Pallone in a competitive race, falling short by about 10 points.

2001–2004: Chairman, New Jersey Republican State Committee 
From 2001 to 2004, Kyrillos served as Chairman of the New Jersey Republican State Committee and a member of the Republican National Committee, where he worked to elect Republicans who shared his vision. In that role, he facilitated the logistics and implementation of the 2004 Republican National Convention in New York City and read the delegate count for President George W. Bush's nomination for re-election on the convention floor.

2008 Romney presidential campaign
Kyrillos was the New Jersey Chairman of Mitt Romney's 2008 presidential campaign.

2009 Christie gubernatorial campaign
In 2009, Kyrillos served as chairman of Chris Christie's successful gubernatorial campaign and was a member of the Governor's Transition Committee, serving as the liaison to all transition sub-committees.

2012 U.S. Senate election

In June 2011, Kyrillos filed an exploratory committee for a potential race in either 2012 or 2014.

On January 19, 2012, Kyrillos officially decided to run for the U.S. Senate, citing unemployment, housing prices and the national debt as issues he would tackle in the Senate. Kyrillos won the Republican nomination on June 5, 2012. He opposed Democratic incumbent Bob Menendez in the November 6th general election, in which he was defeated 58.4% to 40%.

Memberships 
Kyrillos has served on the boards of the American Council of Young Political Leaders, National Conference of State Legislatures Foundation, Bayshore Senior Day Center, Count Basie Theatre, Garden State Arts Center Foundation, Monmouth County Historical Association, New Jersey Historical Society, Prevention First, Rainbow Foundation, and the Two River Theatre Company.

Personal life
Kyrillos is married to Susan Doctorian Kyrillos and has two children, Max and Georgia.

Election history

References

External links 
 Senator Kyrillos's Official Site
Joe Kyrillos for Senate

 
 Senator Kyrillos' legislative web page, New Jersey Legislature
 New Jersey Legislature financial disclosure forms
 2011 2010 2009 2008  2007 2006 2005 2004
 Senator Joseph M. 'Joe' Kyrillos Jr., Project Vote Smart

|-

|-

|-

1960 births
21st-century American politicians
American people of Greek descent
Boston University College of Communication alumni
Chairmen of the New Jersey Republican State Committee
Hobart and William Smith Colleges alumni
Lawrenceville School alumni
Living people
Republican Party members of the New Jersey General Assembly
Republican Party New Jersey state senators
People from Kearny, New Jersey
People from Middletown Township, New Jersey
Politicians from Monmouth County, New Jersey
Candidates in the 2012 United States elections